The Greater Metro Conference is a high school athletics conference which consists of ten high schools near Milwaukee, Wisconsin.

Member schools 

The conference consists of ten schools, eight public, and two private. The private schools (Marquette and Divine Savior Holy Angels) are all-boys and all-girls Catholic high schools respectively.

History 
The conference was part of an overall southeastern Wisconsin conference realignment plan in 2017. The WIAA-approved changes for the 2017–18 school year added Germantown High School and Wauwatosa West High School and sent West Allis Central High School to the Woodland Conference. The move was hailed by locals as a decision that increased competition in a smaller geographical area.

References

External links
 

 
Wisconsin high school sports conferences
High school sports in Wisconsin
Sports in Milwaukee
High school sports conferences and leagues in the United States